Dmitri Ilyich Ulyanov (– 16 July 1943) was a Russian and Soviet physician and revolutionary, the younger brother of Aleksandr Ulyanov and Vladimir Lenin.

As a medical student at Lomonosov Moscow State University, he became involved with revolutionary activity and joined the illegal Marxist Rabochiy soyuz ("Workers' Union"). He was first arrested in 1897. The following year he was exiled to Tula, then Podolsk, where he was put under police supervision (equivalent to modern probation). As his brother's renown grew, he endured countless arrests. In 1900 he became a correspondent of Iskra. The following year he graduated from the medical school of the University of Tartu.

As a doctor and a Marxist, Ulyanov sought to apply his medical training to the revolutionary struggle. During the Revolution of 1905 he provided medical aid to strikers in Simbirsk. He became a trusted cadre of the Russian Social Democratic Workers' Party and was a delegate to its 2nd Congress. He served as the representative of the Central Committee in Kiev. His duties carried him throughout Russia and Ukraine, first to Serpukhov, then to Feodosiya and Crimea.

At the beginning of the First World War, Ulyanov was mobilized into the army. He served as a medical officer in Sevastopol, in Odessa, and on the Romanian front, continuing his revolutionary activities on the side. In 1916 he married Antonia Ivanovna Neshcheretova. He had a son, Viktor, and a daughter, Olga.

Ulyanov remained in Ukraine during the aftermath of the October Revolution and the Civil War, working to strengthen the party apparatus in Crimea and was chairman of the short-lived Crimean Socialist Soviet Republic. In 1921 he moved to Moscow, where he worked at Narkomzdrav (People's Commissariat of Public Health), at the Communist University of the Toilers of the East, in the health research department of the Kremlin, and at the V. I. Lenin Central Museum.

During the 1930s, he collaborated with his sister Maria (who was named after their mother) to write reminiscences about their famous brother, Vladimir Lenin, which were published in serial form. He was a delegate to the 16th and 17th Congresses of the Communist Party of the Soviet Union. He died in Gorki Leninskiye and was buried in Moscow. Many streets and localities in the Soviet Union were renamed in his honor.

References

Further reading
 V. I. Lenin, Letters from Afar, 1893-1922, complete collected works, 5th edition, vol. 55.
 Correspondence of the Ulyanov family, 1883-1917, 1969.
 B. M. Wolfson, D. I. Ulyanov, Questions in the History of the CPSU, 1964.
 R. Khigerov, "The Younger Brother", chapter of the book The Party Steps into the Revolution, 1969.
 Boris Yarochkiy, Dmitri Ulyanov, Young Guards, 1977.

1874 births
1943 deaths
People from Ulyanovsk
People from Simbirsky Uyezd
Russian Social Democratic Labour Party members
Old Bolsheviks
Communist Party of the Soviet Union members
Revolutionaries from the Russian Empire
Military doctors of the Russian Empire
Family of Vladimir Lenin
Russian public health doctors
Soviet people of Jewish descent
University of Tartu alumni
Russian military personnel of World War I
Russian untitled nobility
Soviet public health doctors